Stratas is a surname. Notable people with this surname include:

 David Stratas (born 1960), Canadian jurist
 Diane Stratas (born 1932), Canadian politician and businesswoman
 Teresa Stratas (born 1938), Canadian soprano of Greek descent